The European and African Zone is one of the three zones of regional Davis Cup competition in 2011.

In the European and African Zone there are four different groups in which teams compete against each other to advance to the next group.

Participating teams

Seeds

Remaining Nations

Draw

 and  promoted to Group I in 2012.

First Round Matches

Great Britain vs. Tunisia

Ireland vs. Luxembourg

Belarus vs. Bulgaria

Cyprus vs. Hungary

Morocco vs. Bosnia and Herzegovina

Estonia vs. Lithuania

Denmark vs. Monaco

Greece vs. Latvia

Second Round Matches

Great Britain vs. Luxembourg

Hungary vs. Belarus

Bosnia and Herzegovina vs. Estonia

Denmark vs. Latvia

Play-off Games

Ireland vs. Tunisia

Bulgaria vs. Cyprus

Lithuania vs. Morocco

Greece vs. Monaco

Third Round Matches

Great Britain vs. Hungary

Bosnia and Herzegovina vs. Denmark

References

External links
Draw Results

Europe Africa Zone Group II
Davis Cup Europe/Africa Zone